The Day The Earth Nearly Died is a British documentary produced by BBC to the science and philosophy series Horizon in 2002. The program focuses on the mystery of the Permian extinction, which scientists believe killed over 90% of all life on earth at the end of the Permian, some 250 million years ago. The program features scientists like Adrian Jones, Vincent Courtillot, Gregory Retallack, Peter Ward, Paul Wignall, Michael Benton, Michael R. Rampino and others.

Synopsis
The program features palaeontologists and other scientists as they try to find clues to the great extinction. In the program, it is argued that the Permian extinction came in 3 stages; the first was caused by volcanic activity in the great Siberian Traps. This is proposed to have caused global warming, which in turn killed much of the life on land. Second, it warmed up the sea, which killed much of the marine life. As the sea became warmer, the ocean floor released a massive amount of methane. As the methane reached the atmosphere, the earth became even warmer, which led to the extinction of even more lifeforms on land. In the program, the extinction is argued to have lasted less than 1 million years.

References

External links
 Transcript of the program.
 The Day The Earth Nearly Died at Internet Movie Database.

BBC television documentaries
British television specials
Documentary films about extinctions
Documentary films about prehistoric life
Horizon (British TV series)
2002 television specials